Terra (EOS AM-1) is a multi-national, NASA scientific research satellite in a Sun-synchronous orbit around the Earth that takes simultaneous measurements of Earth's atmosphere, land, and water to understand how Earth is changing and to identify the consequences for life on Earth. It is the flagship of the Earth Observing System (EOS) and the first satellite of the system which was followed by Aqua (launched in 2002) and Aura (launched in 2004). Terra was launched in 1999.

The name "Terra" comes from the Latin word for Earth. A naming contest was held by NASA among U.S. high school students. The winning essay was submitted by Sasha Jones of Brentwood, Missouri. The identifier "AM-1" refers to its orbit, passing over the equator in the morning.

Launch 
The satellite was launched from Vandenberg Air Force Base on December 18th, 1999, aboard an Atlas IIAS vehicle and began collecting data on February 24th, 2000.

Mission 

Terra carries a payload of five remote sensors designed to monitor the state of Earth's environment and ongoing changes in its climate system:
ASTER (Advanced Spaceborne Thermal Emission and Reflection Radiometer) ASTER creates high-resolution images of clouds, ice, water and the land surface using 3 different sensor subsystems. They are the Shortwave Infrared (SWIR); Thermal Infrared (TIR); and Visible and Near Infrared (VNIR). They cover 14 multi-spectral bands from visible to the thermal infrared. The SWIR stopped working in 2008. ASTER was provided by Japan's Ministry of Economy, Trade, and Industry.
CERES (Clouds and the Earth's Radiant Energy System)
MISR (Multi-angle Imaging SpectroRadiometer)
MODIS (Moderate-resolution Imaging Spectroradiometer)
MOPITT (Measurements of Pollution in the Troposphere)
Data from the satellite helps scientists better understand the spread of pollution around the globe. Studies have used instruments on Terra to examine trends in global carbon monoxide and aerosol pollution. The data collected by Terra will ultimately become a new, 15-year global data set.

After launch, operators observed that high energy protons like those found over the South Atlantic Anomaly or the poles could induce single-event upsets that would cause the Motor Drive Assembly (MDA) Built-In Test Equipment (BITE) to turn off the MDA. These false shut-downs occur 12–14 times a month and eventually the operations team automated the recovery to reduce the impact of these shut-downs.

Starting in 2007, increased thermal resistance in the SWIR cryocooler of the ASTER instrument caused the temperature to gradually increase. By 2008, despite frequent attempts to recycle the cryocooler the data began to significantly degrade and on January 12, 2009, ASTER managers declared the SWIR no longer functional due to anomalously high SWIR detector temperatures. Data gathered after April 2008 was declared not usable.

On October 13, 2009, Terra suffered a single battery cell failure anomaly and a battery heater control anomaly likely the result of a Micrometeoroid or Orbital Debris (MMOD) strike.

On February 27, 2020, the Terra flight operations team conducted Terra's last inclination adjust maneuver due to the satellite's limited remaining fuel. With no more such maneuvers, Terra's mean local time has begun to drift starting in April 2021 and with it, its data quality. In October 2022, Terra is expected to reach and exceed a 10:15 AM MLT crossing which is expected to lead operators to initiate a constellation exit to a lower orbit altitude (694 km). Decommissioning would occur around 2025-26 followed by an un-controlled reentry several years later.

Malicious cyber activities 
In June and October 2008 the spacecraft was targeted by hackers who gained unauthorized access to its command and control systems, but did not issue any commands.

Gallery of images by Terra

See also 
 Aqua (satellite)
 Artificial structures visible from space
 Aura (satellite)

References

External links 

 NASA Terra site

Earth observation satellites of the United States
NASA satellites orbiting Earth
Spacecraft launched by Atlas rockets
Spacecraft launched in 1999